William Angus Manson Gunn AM (22 June 1920 – 20 September 2001) was an Australian politician who represented the Queensland Legislative Assembly seat of Somerset from 1972 until 1992. A member of the National Party, he also served as a Minister and Deputy Premier in various Queensland administrations during the 1980s, and was instrumental in establishing the Fitzgerald Inquiry.

Early life 
William Angus Manson Gunn was born in Laidley, Queensland in the Lockyer Valley west of Brisbane, the youngest of seven children to Ewen William Gunn and his wife Rosia (née Geismann). He attended Laidley North Primary School and Gatton High School, and played representative rugby league football for Ipswich in the Bulimba Cup competition. At 21, he joined the Freemasons' Lodge, in which he was heavily involved until the start of his political career.

During World War II, he served in the First Cavalry Mobile Veterinary Service at Gympie, where he developed his knowledge of veterinary practice, which he continued privately after the war.

On 12 April 1952, he married Lorna Klibbe, whom he had met working in a local cafe. They had five children and, ultimately, 17 grandchildren.

Politics 
On 20 July 1966, Gunn was appointed to a vacancy on the Laidley Shire Council, and on 10 April 1970, he became Chairman of the Shire, a role in which he served until 1973.

At the 1972 state election, he was elected to the Legislative Assembly seat of Somerset, which covered much of the Lockyer Valley.

Government Minister
After the 1980 state election, he became Minister of Education on 23 December 1980. On 6 December 1982, he vacated this role in order that Lin Powell could enter the ministry, and took on the new portfolio of Commerce and Industry. At the same time he elected as deputy Nationals leader defeating Mike Ahern 18 votes to 16 on the third ballot.

Deputy Premier
On 18 August, following a split in the Coalition which saw all Liberal members removed from the Ministry, Gunn was promoted to Deputy Premier. He was also the Minister assisting the Treasurer. On 6 February 1986, he replaced Bill Glasson as Minister for Police, and served as the Queensland representative on the National Crime Authority.

During the Joh for Canberra campaign being planned by Premier Sir Joh Bjelke-Petersen and a number of his supporters, Gunn assumed control and chaired cabinet meetings on a number of occasions. He was explicitly favoured by Bjelke-Petersen to succeed himself as Premier. However, concerns about corruption in the police force had been aired on Four Corners (in Chris Masters' "Moonlight State", aired on 11 May 1987) and in other media including the state newspaper The Courier-Mail. Gunn, who was described by the Courier-Mail as an "honest and thoroughly decent politician", wanted the allegations investigated and on 26 May 1987, at a meeting chaired by Gunn, the government agreed to a commission of inquiry which came to be known as the Fitzgerald Inquiry. 

The hearings began two months later and ultimately were to prove the undoing of the conservative government which had been in power for over 30 years. Furthermore, Gunn also renominated Sir Robert Sparkes, by this stage not on good terms with Bjelke-Petersen, to another term as party president.

Bjelke-Petersen had been forced to name a retirement date of 8 August 1988, and at the Townsville conference of the National Party in November 1987, delegates approved Sparkes's position with regard to a number of issues, and rebuffed that of Bjelke-Petersen. Gunn told the Courier-Mail on 8 November that Sir Joh was "out of time" and that he should "go fishing, have a rest and do a fair bit of thinking". On 23–24 November, Bjelke-Petersen visited the Governor of Queensland Sir Walter Campbell, attempting to have five ministers sacked — including Gunn, for alleged disloyalty in nominating Sparkes as party president — and seeking support for an early election. The Governor, however, received advice from Gunn and fellow ministers Mike Ahern and Brian Austin that Bjelke-Petersen no longer had parliamentary support. He therefore interpreted the crisis as a political rather than constitutional one, and declined to intervene, suggesting the party room should resolve it. On 26 November, a caucus meeting was called to replace Bjelke-Petersen as leader — a spill motion was carried 39 votes to 8, and Ahern won the leadership with 30 votes to Gunn's 16 and Russ Hinze's 2. Gunn won the deputy leadership unopposed.

Bjelke-Petersen finally stepped down on 1 December 1987. Ahern and Gunn then each assumed eight portfolios temporarily while the process of choosing a new Cabinet was undertaken, and on 9 December, Gunn was appointed Deputy Premier, Minister for Public Works, Main Roads, Police and the World Expo 88 to be held in Brisbane. Among other things, he was responsible for a multimillion-dollar program to help local councils develop regional road infrastructure, and getting bullet-proof vests as standard issue for police officers. On 25 September 1989, following Russell Cooper's ascension to the premiership, he became Minister for Finance and Local Government.

The National Party was defeated at the December 1989 elections by the Labor Party led by Wayne Goss. Gunn's seat of Somerset was abolished in a redistribution designed to end the so-called Bjelkemander which had malapportioned seats in favour of country areas, and he retired at the 1992 election.

Later life 
Gunn's daughter Helen married a man from Badu Island in the Torres Strait, and Gunn visited the islands many times, developing a love for the islands and their people, culture and history.

On 20 September 2001, he died at the Gatton Hospital and was buried privately after a State funeral at the Laidley Cultural Centre six days later.

Legacy 
The Bill Gunn Dam is named after him.

References

External links 

 

1920 births
2001 deaths
Members of the Queensland Legislative Assembly
People from Queensland
Deputy Premiers of Queensland
National Party of Australia members of the Parliament of Queensland
20th-century Australian politicians